The following is a list of Michigan State Historic Sites in Delta County, Michigan. Sites marked with a dagger (†) are also listed on the National Register of Historic Places in Delta County, Michigan.


Current listings

See also
 National Register of Historic Places listings in Delta County, Michigan

Sources
 Historic Sites Online – Delta County. Michigan State Housing Developmental Authority. Accessed January 23, 2011.

References

Delta County
State Historic Sites
Tourist attractions in Delta County, Michigan